David Christopher Lee (born July 21, 1982) is an American photographer and film director who travels the world shooting high fashion, celebrities, entertainment, food, and art. As a Chinese American photographer, Lee engages his cultural aesthetic within his contemporary American affiliation with histories past.

Background
Lee was born into a (Taishan) Chinese American family at Whittier Presbyterian Hospital in Whittier, California, with two younger sisters, Krystal, co-founder and president of Club Green Volleyball Club in Southern California, and Ashley, prominent California volleyball champion and co-founder of Club Green Volleyball Club. Lee's Father Norman, former High School teacher and co-founder of Graphic Motion in partnership with Lee's mother Jeanie who is CEO. Lee Graduated from Glen A. Wilson High School, in Hacienda Heights, California, and graduated from the University of California, Berkeley.

Early life
Lee grew up primarily in Hacienda Heights. Inspired by the works of artists such as Annie Leibovitz, Ansel Adams, Steven Spielberg, Stanley Kubrick, Disney, and Andy Warhol, Lee developed a wide array of interest within the field of creating. Lee's interest in popular culture and entertainment gossip led him to pursue journalism and photography. At the age of 17 Lee Shot for 17 Magazine, Teen Choice Awards, Nickelodeon, Britney Spears, Beyoncé and 'N Sync.

Career
In 1999, Lee began his career in the entertainment industry as a photographer on the red carpet. Lee's work is showcased all over the world and can be seen on the Las Vegas Strip, and in New York's Times Square. Lee is the co-founder of TDink Magazine with renowned Bay Area graphic designer Tiffany Chin, and has started many other successful publications such as, dTownLA.com and destinationluxury.com, davids-guide.com and thebiohack.org. Recently Lee has been Directing and Producing Short Films for some of the most important icons in fashion such as Zac Posen, Jill Stuart and Lee Daniels.  Currently resides in Los Angeles, California and New York.

Publications
People, 
Seventeen,
Teen,
Teen People,
Ocean Drive
Vogue Taiwan,
Vegas,
Teen Now, 
Attitude Magazine, 
Instinct Magazine (cover), 
Nirvana Magazine (cover), 
Vivid Magazine (cover), 
Surfer Girl Magazine, 
Yellow Magazine (cover), 
Lucire Magazine, 
Teen People Magazine, 
Supermodels Unlimited Magazine, 
Unleashed Magazine, 
IGN.com, 
Permission Magazine, 
The Rafu Shimpo, 
The SF Examiner, 
Asiance Magazine, 
Askmen.com,
The New York Times
Lee is the founder of Thebiohack.org and Destinationluxury.com

Celebrities photographed
Mandy Moore, 
Misty May (2008 Woman's Olympic Volleyball Team), 
Kim Kardashian, 
Michael Madsen,
Kevin Durand, 
Lee Daniels, 
Mark McGrath, 
Alan Chin (artist),
Kourtney Kardashian, 
Khloé Kardashian, 
Jaime Pressly, 
Shawn Pyfrom,
Ken Davitan,  
Linda Hamilton (Terminator 2: Judgment Day), 
Kelly Hu, 
Lacey Chabert (Mean Girls), 
Simon Rex, 
Andre Legacy, 
Casey Johnson (Johnson & Johnson heiress), 
Mimi Rogers, 
Russell Wong, 
Lindsay Price (Lipstick Jungle), 
Bai Ling, 
Margaret Cho, 
Bobby Lee, 
Tom DeLonge from (Blink-182), 
Catt Sadler, 
Noureen DeWulf, 
Drew Seeley, 
Harajuku Girls, 
Rex Lee, 
Jason Wahler (The Hills), 
Lady Gaga, 
Marie Digby, 
Mickey Avalon, 
Rachel Sterling (Pussycat Dolls), 
Raven-Symoné, 
Scott Michael Foster (Greek), 
Shawn Pyfrom (Desperate Housewives), 
Bo Benton, 
Steve Aoki, 
Sara Paxton, 
Tomiko Frasier, 
Cheryl Burke (Dancing with the Stars), 
James Kyson Lee (Heroes), 
Mei Melancon (X-Men: The Last Stand), 
Pusher Deville, 
Doug & Jackie Christie
Lisa Ray, 
Michael Copon, (One Tree Hill), 
Blu Cantrell, 
Bai Ling,
Lindsay Price,  
Emmanuelle Chriqui)
Julianne Hough, 
Demi Moore, 
Martin Starr, 
Ed Begley Jr., 
Amber Liu, 
Lady Gaga, 
Britney Spears,

External links
David Christopher Lee Official Instagram
David Christopher Lee Official Site
 IGN.com feature
Destination Luxury Magazine
TDink Magazine
thebiohack.org
Model Mayhem Blog
D town LA Magazine
http://altpick.com/davidclee

1982 births
Living people
Commercial photographers
People from Hacienda Heights, California
People from Whittier, California
Photographers from California